The Gukurahundi was a genocide in Zimbabwe which arose in 1982 until the Unity Accord in 1987. It derives from a Shona-language term which loosely translates to "the early rain which washes away the chaff before the spring rains".

During the Rhodesian Bush War, two rival nationalist parties, Robert Mugabe's Zimbabwe African National Union (ZANU) and Joshua Nkomo's Zimbabwe African People's Union (ZAPU), had emerged to challenge Rhodesia's predominantly white government. ZANU initially defined Gukurahundi as an ideological strategy aimed at carrying the war into major settlements and individual homesteads. Following Mugabe's ascension to power, his government remained threatened by "dissidents" – disgruntled former guerrillas and supporters of ZAPU.

ZANU recruited mainly from the majority Shona people, whereas ZAPU had its greatest support among the Ndebele and Kalanga peoples. In early 1983, the North Korean-trained Fifth Brigade, an infantry brigade of the Zimbabwe National Army (ZNA), began a crackdown on dissidents in the Matabeleland North, Matabeleland South, and Midlands provinces, home of the Ndebele and Kalanga. Over the following two years, thousands of Ndebele and Kalanga were detained by government forces and either marched to re-education camps, tortured, raped and/or summarily executed. Although there are different estimates, the consensus of the International Association of Genocide Scholars (IAGS) is that more than 20,000 people were killed. The IAGS has classified the massacres as a genocide.

Background
Before the Rhodesian Bush War, the main black nationalist organisation in Southern Rhodesia, the Zimbabwe African People's Union (ZAPU), split into two groups in 1963, the split-away group being the Zimbabwe African National Union (ZANU). Though these groups had a common origin they gradually grew apart, with the split away group, ZANU, recruiting mainly from the Shona regions, while ZAPU recruited mainly from Ndebele-speaking regions in the west.

There is a much earlier source for Shona hostility to the Ndebele, going back to the arrival in 1837 of Mzilikazi and his Matabeleland kingdom. Mzilikazi carved out a territory for himself by fighting and dispossessing the local VaRozvi led by Changamire Chirisamhuru, the then patriach.

The armies of these two groups, ZAPU's Zimbabwe People's Revolutionary Army (ZIPRA), and ZANU's Zimbabwe African National Liberation Army (ZANLA), developed rivalries for the support of the people and would fight each other. When Rhodesia became Zimbabwe in 1980, following the Lancaster House Agreement, the two armies so distrusted each other that it was difficult to integrate them both into the national army. In the elections held in April 1980, ZANU received 57 out of 100 seats and Robert Mugabe became prime minister.

Dr. Stuart Doran, a historian specialising in Zimbabwe, using historical documents, has written a short article 'New documents claim to prove Mugabe ordered Gukurahundi killings' way back in 1983. Quoted in part: The documents point to internal killings neither provoked nor sustained by outsiders, suggesting that the atrocities were driven from the top by ZANU–PF in pursuit of specific political objectives. Viewed across a period of several years, the documents appear to provide evidence that the massacres were but one component of a sustained and strategic effort to remove all political opposition within five years of independence. ZANU–PF leaders were determined to secure a "victory" against a non-existent opposition in elections scheduled for 1985, after which there would be a "mandate" from the people to impose a one-party state.

Entumbane uprisings

In November 1980 Enos Nkala made remarks at a rally in Bulawayo, in which he warned ZAPU that ZANU would deliver a few blows against them. This preceded the first outbreak of fighting in Entumbane Bulawayo, during which ZIPRA and the Zimbabwe National Army fought a pitched battle for two days.

In February 1981 there was a second uprising, which spread to Glenville and also to Connemara in the Midlands. ZIPRA troops in other parts of Matabeleland headed for Bulawayo to join the battle, and the Zimbabwean National army units had to come in to stop the fighting.

The government asked Justice Enoch Dumbutshena, the former Chief Justice of Zimbabwe, to hold an inquiry into the uprising – ZIPRA was found to be preparing for war.

Many ZIPRA cadres defected after Entumbane, fearing retribution.

1982
This situation became worse after the government claimed to have found of arms caches in February 1982. ZANU now openly accused ZAPU of plotting another war and ZAPU leaders were arrested or removed from cabinet. However, the treason trial in 1982 involving Dumiso Dabengwa, Lookout Masuku, and four others failed to prove a case against them. All were released although Dabengwa and Masuku were re-detained without trial for four years. As a result, ex-ZIPRA cadres deserted the army after this. They did this out of necessity to stay alive. With their leaders all locked up or in exile, they felt there was nobody to protect them within the army. "We were threatened, that was why I decided to desert," said one dissident.

The army integration scheme saw former ZIPRA recruits being harassed and accused of sympathising with their deserted colleagues. They were no longer trusted and were being constantly harassed. However, Joshua Nkomo publicly disowned the deserted soldiers and thus discouraged any others from leaving the army.

Meanwhile, South Africa's policy of destabilising Zimbabwe by military means, while blaming ZAPU for the actions of South African agents, continued and  escalate the breakdown between ZAPU and ZANU.

Fifth Brigade

Robert Mugabe, then prime minister, had signed an agreement with North Korean leader Kim Il-sung in October 1980 to have the North Korean military train a brigade for the Zimbabwean army. This was soon after Mugabe had announced the need for a militia to "combat malcontents." Mugabe replied by saying dissidents should "watch out," announcing the brigade would be called "Gukurahundi." This brigade was named the Fifth Brigade. The members of the Fifth Brigade were drawn from 3,500 ex-ZANLA troops at Tongogara Assembly Point, named after Josiah Tongogara, the ZANLA general. There were a few ZIPRA (ZAPU) troops in the unit for a start, but they were withdrawn before the end of the training. The training of 5th Brigade lasted until September 1982, when Minister Sekeramayi announced training was complete.

The first Commander of the Fifth Brigade was Colonel Perrance Shiri. The Fifth Brigade was different from all other Zimbabwean army units in that it was directly subordinated to the Prime Minister office, and not integrated to the normal army command structures. Their codes, uniforms, radios and equipment were not compatible with other army units. Their most distinguishing feature in the field was their red berets.

Conflict and killings
In January 1983, a crackdown by the  Fifth Brigade in Matabeleland North was initiated to purge the dissidents, and its participation lasted until late 1984. The brigade's directives apparently specified a search for local ZAPU officials and veterans of ZAPU's armed wing, the Zimbabwe People's Revolutionary Army (ZIPRA). Seizure or detention by the Fifth Brigade was arbitrary. In Bulawayo, for instance, Ndebele men of fighting age were considered potential dissidents and therefore, guilty of subversive activities. Most detained were summarily executed or marched to re-education camps. Most of the dead were shot in public executions, often after being forced to dig their own graves in front of family and fellow villagers. On occasion the Fifth Brigade also massacred large groups of Ndebele, seemingly at random—the largest such incident occurred in March 1983, when 62 young men and women were shot on the banks of the Cewale River, Lupane. Seven survived with gunshot wounds, the other 55 died. Another way 5 Brigade used to kill large groups of people was to burn them alive in huts. They did this in Tsholotsho and also in Lupane. They would routinely round up dozens, or even hundreds, of civilians and march them at gun point to a central place, like a school or bore-hole. There they would be forced to sing Shona songs praising ZANU, at the same time being beaten with sticks. These gatherings usually ended with public executions. Those killed could be ex-ZIPRAs, ZAPU officials, or anybody chosen at random. The Zimbabwe government repudiated these allegations and accused the hostile foreign press of fabricating stories. Zimbabwean Minister for National Security Sydney Sekeramayi countered that allegations of atrocities were part of a ZAPU disinformation programme to discredit the army. The government characterised such allegations as irresponsible, contrived propaganda because it failed to give proper weight to the violence by dissidents, who targeted ZANU officials. It is estimated that 700–800 people were murdered by dissident gangs in rural regions. In August 1985, dissidents massacred 22 Shona civilians in Mwenezi. On a mission farm in Matobo, dissidents massacred 16 people.

Death estimates 
The Catholic Commission for Justice and Peace in Zimbabwe documented at least 2,000 deaths, and speculated that the actual number could be 8,000 or higher. Locals from the affected regions put the figure between 20,000 and 40,000. Journalist Heidi Holland referred to a death toll of 8,000 as a typical conservative estimate. In February 1983 the International Red Cross disclosed that 1,200 Ndebele had been murdered that month alone. In a unanimously adopted resolution in 2005, the International Association of Genocide Scholars estimated the death toll at 20,000.

Reactions 
In 1992 serving Defence Minister Moven Mahachi became the first ZANU official who publicly apologised for the execution and torture of civilians by the Fifth Brigade. Five years later, Enos Nkala, former defence minister, described his involvement with Gukurahundi as "eternal hell" and blamed President Mugabe for having orchestrated it. Speaking at Joshua Nkomo's memorial service on 2 July 2000, Mugabe admitted that "thousands" had been killed during the campaign, calling it a "moment of madness".

Unity Accord of 1987

Robert Mugabe and ZAPU leader Joshua Nkomo signed the Unity Accord on 22 December 1987. This effectively merged ZAPU and ZANU into the Zimbabwe African National Union – Patriotic Front (ZANU–PF). On 18 April 1988, Mugabe announced an amnesty for all dissidents, and Nkomo called on them to lay down their arms. A general ordinance was issued saying all those who surrendered before 31 May would get a full pardon. This was extended not just to dissidents but to criminals of various types serving jail terms. Over the next few weeks, 122 dissidents surrendered. In June, the amnesty was extended to include all members of the security forces who had committed human rights violations.

Aftermath 
In the 1990s, the disturbances were finally at an end. This brought relief nationwide, but in parts of the country it left behind many problems that remain unsolved. These include poor health, poverty, practical and legal problems and a deep-rooted suspicion of government officials. With the emergence of a 'new dispensation' under Emmerson Mnangagwa, there was a general expectation that for the first time the government would publicly apologise for the atrocities. However, like his predecessor, Mnangagwa has not done anything that can be accepted by the victims as bringing closure. This comes after Mnangagwa set up a seven-member Commission of Inquiry in early 2019 chaired by former South African President Kgalema Motlanthe which critics like the Mthwakazi Republic Party (MRP) argue, will not solve the underlying problems. There is general discontent and people from the affected communities do not believe that the Government is sincere in its commitments towards the Gukurahundi genocide issue.

In popular culture 
Zimbabwean author Christopher Mlalazi has written a novel on the Gukurahundi killings from a child's perspective, Running with Mother (2012).

References

Citations

Sources

External links

Documentary film:  (director: Robyn Paterson, 2012) includes interviews with Zimbabwean civilians and refugees about Gukurahundi and the policy of Mugabe

1980s conflicts
1983 in Zimbabwe
1984 in Zimbabwe
1985 in Zimbabwe
1986 in Zimbabwe
1987 in Zimbabwe
Aftermath of the Rhodesian Bush War
Conflicts in 1983
Conflicts in 1984
Conflicts in 1985
Conflicts in 1986
Conflicts in 1987
Dirty wars
Ethnic cleansing in Africa
Extrajudicial killings in Zimbabwe
Genocides in Africa
History of Zimbabwe
Human rights abuses in Zimbabwe
Mass murder in 1983
Mass murder in 1984
Mass murder in 1985
Mass murder in 1986
Mass murder in 1987
Massacres in Zimbabwe
Military operations post-1945
Northern Ndebele people
Political and cultural purges
Political repression in Zimbabwe
Politicides
Zimbabwe African People's Union
ZANU–PF